Dolors Terradas i Viñals (born 24 February 1949) is a Spanish teacher and politician, a member of the Congress of Deputies during the 11th Legislature.

Biography
Dolors Terradas earned a licentiate in history from the University of Girona. She also performed studies on demography in Pla de l'Estany, some of which she published in the Revista de Girona.

In 1971 she became politically active in the Unified Socialist Party of Catalonia (PSUC), and was victorious as their candidate for the Banyoles municipal council in the 1983 local elections. In 1988 she left the PSUC, and in the 1999 elections she occupied the symbolic 17th place in the Republican Left of Catalonia (ERC) list for the municipality of Banyoles. In 1996 she was the leader of the Banyoles festival.

Since 1994, she has participated in the social movement Banyoles Solidària, where she deals with the legalization and literacy of immigrants and cooperates with The Gambia and other countries in the process of economic development. In the 2015 general election she won a seat in the Congress of Deputies as head of the En Comú Podem list for Girona. She served on the Interior Commission, and was second vice president of the Commission of International Cooperation for Development.

Publications
 Sobre la divisió territorial de Catalunya i el cas polèmic de Banyoles (1976)
 Població i societat a Banyoles al segle XVIII (1981) 
 Les epidèmies de còlera a Banyoles en el segle XIX (1982), published in the Revista de Girona
 La Població de Banyoles al s. XVIII (1983)
 Aproximació a un exemple d'industrialització no reeixit: Banyoles 1700–1900 (1985)

References

External links
 Les epidèmies de còlera a Banyoles en el segle XIX in Revista de Girona

1949 births
20th-century Spanish educators
Spanish women educators
Educators from Catalonia
Living people
Members of the 11th Congress of Deputies (Spain)
Municipal councillors in the province of Girona
Republican Left of Catalonia politicians
University of Girona alumni
20th-century women educators
20th-century Spanish women